Shamrock Bowl XXII was played on August 10, 2008. The match featured the Irish American Football League South Division champions University of Limerick Vikings meet the IAFL Central Division Champions Dublin Rebels in CIT Stadium, Cork, Ireland. The UL Vikings were able win their second consecutive Shamrock Bowl title by defeating the Dublin Rebels 14-12. The MVP of the game was Adrian Garvey who scored the Vikings only offensive touchdown of the game. 

The game was a rematch of the week 13 regular season game when the Rebels beat the Vikings 32-14.
The game was staged in CIT Stadium which has now been made home of the Cork Admirals. Weather conditions were perfect as the sun shined nearly the whole game. This was the second Shamrock Bowl played in a stadium as all other Shamrock Bowls were usually played in ordinary sports grounds.

Teams

UL Vikings 

The UL Vikings came into the game with a 7-1 record from the regular season. The Vikings won every game in the IAFL South Division. After two Shamrock Bowl XXI rematches against the Cork Admirals, the Vikings were capable of beating them twice in the 2008 season. During the playoffs the UL Vikings played the Belfast Trojans in the Semi-Finals on Sunday, 27 July. The Vikings beat the Trojans 42-8 to secure their spot in the Shamrock Bowl. The Vikings played a very impressive game on both offence and defence.

Dublin Rebels 

Entering with the same record as the Vikings at 7-1, the Rebels came in after an upset win over the Cork Admirals in the Semi Final beating them 19-12. Hoping to win their 6th Shamrock Bowl title and trying to win one for the first time in two years, the Rebels entered with high hopes. They finished first in the Central Division with a helpful win in week 13 against the UL Vikings which they won 32-14.

Game summary 

The game began with the UL Vikings kicking off to the Dublin Rebels and Kevin Finnegan returned the ball into Limerick territory. The Rebels Quarterback Andy Dennehy then proceeded to lead a well executed drive to get to the Limerick redzone. Finnegan was the main threat for Dublin from the running back position. The Vikings defence then stepped up their game and big tackles from Kieran Coen and Bill Parkinson stopped the Dublin drive. Vikings QB JP Nerbun then took over and had trouble moving the ball initially against the tough Dublin defense.

A great punt by Daniel Smith put Dublin under pressure but they continued to move the ball well and got back into Limerick territory. A fumble by the Vikings was recovered by the Rebels and they then opened the scoring with a 28-yard field goal by Paul Grogan which put them up three to nil. The Vikes then steeled their resolve and began to gain yards on offense. JP Nerbun completed passes to Tight End Glen Carr and receiver Marc Ashworth and game MVP Adrian Garvey made some big gains on the ground. 

This pressure continued and the Rebels were almost powerless to stop the drive. Garvey punched in the first touchdown of the game from 23 yards out with a dazzling run which combined great speed, elusive moves and crushing strength at the end to put him over the line. The blocking of Mark Thompson, Brendan Moroney, Jim Davis, Kieran Coen, Dave Moloney and Glen Carr was crucial on the drive also. The extra point attempt was blocked. The Rebels then took to the air in a bid to regain the lead. Dennehy completed passes to tight end Paul Smyth. Darragh O'Callaghan then stepped in front of a pass, juggled it for a moment and then secured possession. The Viking defence then turned to blockers and in what resembled a feeding frenzy, O'Callaghan found running room and took the ball all the way back for another Viking touchdown. The sizeable Limerick crowd went crazy after the play. JP Nerbun then threw a spectacular fade pass to Seamus Feehan who snagged the ball and kept his feet in bounds for the 2-point conversion. This score would prove crucial at the final whistle. The rest of the 2nd quarter saw the ball change hands a couple of times but no scores.

2nd Half

The 3rd quarter saw the Rebels come back strongly showing what made them national champions four times this decade. They were awarded 2 points for a safety for a block below the waist penalty on a punt. They then put together their first touchdown drive through great running from Ross McCoohey and Kevin Finnegan which was capped by a touchdown pass to Tight End Paul Smyth. Paul Grogan kicked the extra point. This cut the Vikings lead to only two points and put them in serious danger. 

The fourth quarter was dominated by both teams defences and was a showcase of tense and entertaining football. Garvey continued to pound away on the ground getting the Vikings valuable first downs and keeping the Rebels out of range of scoring. The Vikings defense made some huge stops this quarter with Danny Smith, Mark Gaffney, Cormac Ryan and Kieran Coen making important tackles. The Rebels still managed to move the ball into field goal range and attempted the kick to put them one point up with 3 minutes left. Kieran Coen and Glen Carr surged through the Rebels line pushing one of the Rebels linemen back far enough for the kick to bounce off the lineman's helmet and away to safety. The ball was tipped off line and the kick was no good.

The Vikings then drove the back up the pitch and took 2 minutes off the clock. The Rebels got the ball back again and drove down the field. The atmosphere in the stadium was electric as every play in the drive was life or death. Andy Dennehy completed a number of passes and the Rebels were moving well until the Vikings Safety Liam Ryan made a diving interception in front of Paul Smyth to seal the game and secure the Vikings second National Championship. Adrian Garvey then picked up a first down and the last seconds ticked off of a hugely entertaining Shamrock Bowl.

External links 
 Website of Shamrock Bowl

Shamrock Bowl
2008 in American football
2008 in Irish sport